Muscatatuck County Park, formerly known as Vinegar Mills State Park and Muscatatuck State Park, is a recreational park located by the town of Vernon, Indiana in Jennings County.

Formally opened on May 17, 1921, on land given by Jennings County to the Indiana state government, Vinegar Mills State Park was established as an  park. It was named for an old mill used to cut stone during the pioneer days along the Muscatatuck River. The name was soon changed to Muscatatuck State Park, to reflect the historical Indian name given the River, believed to mean "winding waters".  Aside from a small inn built from a brick house known as the William Read Home, which acted as a bed and breakfast, and wood-floored tents, the property was seldom improved upon; it remained a highly forested area popular with travelers between Madison, Indiana and Indianapolis. While a state park, it was the first to require no financial assistance from the state government, even though it never charged admission and the founder of the Indiana state park system, Richard Lieber, strongly believed in doing so.  However, during the Great Depression both the Civilian Conservation Corps (CCC) and the Works Progress Administration (WPA) made slight improvements to the property, mostly road work and a fire tower.
A water-powered mill operated by an overshot wheel built in the 1830s, Vinegar Mill, located within the park but now in ruins, was first called Stone Mill.  The mill cut building stones used for sills, caps and steps.  Stone cut by the mill may be found as of 1962 in the Jennings County Courthouse in Vernon.  An unnamed source attributes the name "Vinegar Mill" to the mill's apparatus supposed resemblance to a cider press.
In 1962 the state park had an area of 260.60 acres.

Muscatatuck would eventually be redesignated as a state game farm in 1956, concentrating on raising quail and pheasant. In 1962 it had the first youth camp in Indiana meant for the general public, and not for convicted youth. In 1968 the land was returned to Jennings County, which to this day has made it a county park. Although it lagged for twenty years by lack in funds, by the 1990s it saw an increase in funds, endowments, and community interest.

Mountain biking is available in the park.

Muscatatuck County Park should not be confused with nearby Muscatatuck National Wildlife Refuge.

References

County parks in the United States
State parks of Indiana
Protected areas of Jennings County, Indiana
Civilian Conservation Corps in Indiana
Works Progress Administration in Indiana